Something Inside So Strong is the twenty-first studio album by country music singer Kenny Rogers. The album includes the singles "When You Put Your Heart in It", "Planet Texas", "The Vows Go Unbroken", "Something Inside So Strong", and "Maybe". Gladys Knight, Anne Murray, Holly Dunn, and Ronald Isley are featured as duet partners.

Jim Ed Norman produced the album, with additional production from Steve Dorff on "If I Ever Fall in Love Again".

Track listing

Personnel 
 Kenny Rogers – lead vocals
 Matt Rollings – acoustic piano (1, 4-9)
 John Barlow Jarvis – acoustic piano (3)
 Jim Ed Norman – acoustic piano (10)
 David Innis – synthesizers (1, 4, 7, 10)
 Phil Naish – synthesizers (1-6, 9, 10)
 Dennis Burnside – synthesizers (2, 8)
 Mike Lawler – synthesizers (3, 4, 7-10)
 Shane Keister – synthesizers (4)
 Edgar Struble – synthesizers (5), backing vocals (5)
 Randy Kerber – synthesizers (6)
 Carl Marsh – synthesizers (7)
 Steve Gibson – guitar (1-7, 9, 10), acoustic guitar (8)
 Michael Landau – guitar (6)
 Dean Parks – guitar (6)
 Mark Casstevens – acoustic guitar (8, 10)
 David Hungate – bass (1, 4)
 Michael Rhodes – bass (2, 6, 7, 8)
 Willie Weeks – bass (3)
 Mike Brignardello – bass (5, 9)
 Paul Leim – drums
 Jim Horn – saxophone (4, 10)
 Mark Kibble – backing vocals (1, 4)
 Claude V. McKnight III – backing vocals (1, 2, 4)
 John Andrew Parks III – backing vocals (1)
 David Thomas – backing vocals (1, 2)
 Mervyn Warren – backing vocals (1, 2)
 Alvin Chea – backing vocals (2)
 Vicki Hampton – backing vocals (2)
 First Church Inspirational Choir – choir (2)
 Antoinette Wilson – choir conductor (2)
 Chris Harris – backing vocals (3, 4, 5, 7, 9, 10)
 Mark Heimerman – backing vocals (3, 4, 5, 10)
 Gladys Knight – lead vocals (3)
 Gary Janney – backing vocals (4, 5, 7, 9, 10)
 Steven Glassmeyer – backing vocals (5)
 Eugene Golden – backing vocals (5)
 Joe Chemay – backing vocals (6)
 Anne Murray – lead vocals (6)
 Tony Sciuto – backing vocals (6)
 Terry Williams – backing vocals (6)
 Ricky Skaggs – backing vocals (8)
 Sharon White – backing vocals (8)
 Holly Dunn – lead vocals (9)
 Ronald Isley – backing vocals (10)

Production
 Producers – Jim Ed Norman (Tracks 1-10); Steve Dorff (Additional production on Track 6).
 Production Assistant – Danny Kee
 Engineer – Eric Prestidge
 Additional and Assistant Engineers – Joel Bouchillon, Scott Campbell, Robert Charles, Ken Frissen, Jeff Giedt, Lee Groitsch, Brian Hardin, Craig Hansen, John Hurley, Daniel Johnston, John David Parker, Hershey Reeves, Doug Smith, Bart Stevens and James Valentini.
 Recorded at 16th Avenue Sound, Audio Media Recorders, Digital Recorders, The Loft and MasterMix (Nashville, TN); Sound Cell Recording Studios (Hunstville, AL); Bill Schnee Studios (Hollywood, CA); Manta Sound (Toronto, ON, Canada).
 Edited by Keith Odle at GroundStar Laboratories (Nashville, TN).
 Mastered by Glenn Meadows and Eric Prestidge at Masterfonics (Nashville, TN).
 Art Direction and Design – Laura LiPuma
 Photography – Kelly Junkerman and David Skernick
 Management – Ken Kragen

Charts

Weekly charts

Year-end charts

Certifications

References

Kenny Rogers albums
1989 albums
Reprise Records albums
Albums produced by Jim Ed Norman